Stoddart Island, Nova Scotia (alternatively known as Emerald Island or 'East' by the locals) is a privately owned,  tract of land located off the Southern coast of that Atlantic maritimes province, proximate to the small town of Shag Harbour in Shelburne County, Nova Scotia, Canada

The island gained some measure of fame as the site of the lighthouse wherein author Evelyn Fox Richardson spent summers with her grandfather and wrote of this experience. Later, its waters off Toot's Point became a favorite haunt for Franklin Delano Roosevelt on boat crossings from his vacation home in Campobello Island, New Brunswick.

References
  Shelburne County museum: Shag Harbour, Clark's Harbour, Stoddart, Bon Portage 
  My Other Islands, Evelyn Fox Richardson, Ryerson Press, 1960 
  Official Campobello Website
  FDR Campobello National Park
  Stoddart Island Lighthouse, restored but now dark
  Sat Map/Photo link of Island and Area

Islands of Nova Scotia
Former British colonies and protectorates in the Americas
Private islands of Canada